Rambaldi is an Italian surname. Notable people with the surname include:

Benvenuto Rambaldi da Imola (1320–1388), Italian scholar and historian
Carlo Rambaldi (1925–2012), Italian special effects artist
Carlo Antonio Rambaldi (1680–1717), Italian painter
Francesco Rambaldi (born 1999), Italian chess grandmaster
Giulia Rambaldi Guidasci (born 1986), Italian water polo player
Julien Rambaldi, French film director
Milo Rambaldi, a character from the TV series Alias